A minibus, microbus, minicoach, or commuter (in Zimbabwe) is a passenger-carrying motor vehicle that is designed to carry more people than a multi-purpose vehicle or minivan, but fewer people than a full-size bus. In the United Kingdom, the word "minibus" is used to describe any full-sized passenger-carrying van or panel truck. Minibuses have a seating capacity of between 12 and 30 seats. Larger minibuses may be called midibuses. Minibuses are typically front engine step-in vehicles, although low floor minibuses are particularly common in Japan.

History
It is unknown when the first minibus vehicle was developed. For example, Ford Model T vehicles were modified for passenger transport by early bus companies and entrepreneurs. Ford produced a version during the 1920s to carry up to 12 people.

Usage
Minibuses are used for a variety of reasons. In a public transport role, they can be used as fixed route transit buses, airport buses, flexible demand responsive transport vehicles, share taxis or large taxicabs. Accessible minibuses can also be used for paratransit type services, by local authorities, transit operators, hospitals or charities. Private uses of minibuses can include corporate transport, charter buses, tour buses. Schools, sports clubs, community groups and charities may also use minibuses for private transport. Individual owners may use reduced seating minibuses as cheap recreational vehicles.

Types
Midibuses are minibuses bigger than microbuses but smaller than full-size buses.

There are many different types and configurations of minibuses, due to historical and local differences, and usage. Minibus designs can be classified in three main groups, with a general increase in seating capacity with each type:
Van conversions. Simple, optional extras
Body builds
Purpose-built

Van conversions

The most basic source of minibuses is the van conversion, where the minibus is derived by modifying the existing van design. Conversions may be produced completely by the van manufacturer, sold as part of their standard model line-up, or be produced by specialist conversion companies, who source a suitably prepared base model from the van manufacturer for final completion as a minibus.

Van conversions involve adding windows to the bodywork, and seating to the cargo area. Van conversion minibuses outwardly look the same shape as the parent van, and the driver and front passenger cabin remains unchanged, retaining the driver and passenger doors. Access to the former cargo area for passengers is through the standard van side sliding door, or the rear doors. These may be fitted with step equipment to make boarding easier. Optional extras to van converted minibuses can include the addition of a rollsign for transit work, and/or a full-height walk-in door, for passenger access to the former cargo area. For public transport use, this door may be an automatic concertina type. For other uses, this may be a simple plug style coach door. Depending on the relevant legislation, conversions may also involve wheelchair lifts and tachograph equipment. A van conversion with a passenger area in the front and a storage area in the back, behind a fixed bulkhead, is called a splitter bus.

Examples of vans used for these conversion minibuses are:
Fiat Ducato
Ford Transit
Freight Rover Sherpa
GAZelle
Hyundai H350
Iveco Daily
Mercedes-Benz Sprinter
Renault Master
Toyota Hiace
Volkswagen Crafter
Tata Winger

Body builds

Another method of building a minibus is for a second stage manufacturer to build a specific body for fitting to a semi-completed van or light truck chassis. These allow a higher seating capacity than a simple van conversion. Often, the second stage manufacturer is a bus manufacturer.

In a body-on-chassis minibus, a cabin body is installed on a van or light truck chassis encompassing the drivers area. These designs may retain some outward signs of the original van, such as the hood and grill. Other designs are visually a complete bus design, and it is merely the chassis underneath that is from the van design.

The body-on-chassis approach gives the advantage of higher seating capacity, or more room for passenger comfort, through a larger cabin area. There is also the advantage of being able to have the drivers seat positioned in a small cubicle, next to the main passenger entrance, allowing the driver to collect fares in a transit bus role.

Examples of body built minibuses are:
Busette (cut away chassis)
Optare CityPacer (visually complete bus based on a van chassis)
Plaxton Beaver (built on the Mercedes-Benz T2 and later the Vario chassis)

Examples of vehicles used for this type of minibuses are:
Ford Transit
Freight Rover
Iveco Daily
Isuzu Elf locally built as the NQR bus

Purpose built

A next generation approach to the van-derived or cutaway chassis approach, is for manufacturers to produce an integral design, where the whole vehicle is purposely designed and built for use as a minibus. This is usually done by an integral bus manufacturer, although large automotive groups also produce their own models. These designs are often available in long high capacity versions, and may attract different designations, such as midibus, or light bus.

Examples of purpose built minibuses are:
Hino Liesse
Isuzu Journey
MCW Metrorider (also termed a midibus)
Nissan Diesel RN
Nissan Civilian
Mitsubishi Fuso Rosa
Toyota Coaster
Karsan J9 Premier (Similar-looking ancestor Peugeot J9 is a van conversion)
Karsan J10
Hyundai County
Daewoo Lestar
Renault Dodge S56

Low floor minibuses

Following the development of low-floor technology, some low-floor purpose built minibuses have been created. Some offer a low floor access through a centre door. Some short versions of low floor midibuses are sometimes also called minibuses.
Orion International "Orion II"
Mitsubishi Fuso Aero Midi ME
Optare Solo (termed a midibus)
Optare Alero
Hino Poncho (1st generation front-engined, 2nd rear-engined)
Nissan Diesel RN (some models have a low floor middle entrance)
Bluebird Tucana (full length low flat floor from Bluebird Vehicles Ltd)
Bluebird Auriga (tri-axle design)
Mercedes-Benz Sprinter
Karsan Jest
Mellor Sigma 7

Regional variants

There are many different form of public transportation services around the world that are provided by using vehicles that can be considered as minibus:
Chiva bus in Colombia and Ecuador
Colectivo in southern South America
Community bus (Japanese コミュニティバス komiunitibasu) in Japan (Include minibus and midibus)
Dala dala in Tanzania
Dollar van a.k.a. jitneys, in the United States.
Dolmuş in Turkey
Jeepney in the Philippines
Maeul-bus (Korean 마을버스) in South Korea
Marshrutka in eastern Europe.
Matatu around Kenya
Minibus taxi in South Africa, Ethiopia, see also Taxi wars in South Africa
Pesero, minibuses operating as regular buses in Mexico, especially in Mexico City.
Public light buses, in Hong Kong.
Sherut in Israel
Songthaew around Thailand and Lao
Tap tap in Haiti
Tro tro around Ghana
Weyala in Ethiopia

Driving licence
Some countries may require an additional class of driving licence over a normal private car licence, and some may require a full commercial driving licence. The need for such a licence may depend on:
Vehicle weight or size
Seating capacity
Driver age
Intended usage
Additional training (such as the Minibus Driver Awareness Scheme in the UK)

In the UK the following information regarding Minibus driving licences is important:
"The holder of an ordinary car driving licence which was obtained prior to January 1997, once aged 21 years minimum, may drive a Minibus with a capacity of 16 passengers. Where the "ordinary car driving licence" is obtained after December 1996, they will have to take a separate test to drive a vehicle with a capacity of more than 8 passengers. However, there is an exemption for certain volunteer drivers, where the vehicle does not exceed 3500 kg GVW (or 4250 kg GVW if the vehicle is designed to be wheelchair accessible). Driving licence source

A driving licence issued in Ontario, Canada, for an equivalent of a UK class B or class B-auto driving licence (in the case of Ontario, a class G licence), allows its holder to drive vehicles with:
11 tonnes maximum authorized mass, including trailers with 4.6 tonnes MAM (6 tonnes MAM in certain cases)
passenger seating capacity of 9 or less

Anyone wanting to drive a vehicle in Ontario, with the same MAM limits as for class G vehicles, with fewer than 25, but at least 10, passenger seats, must obtain a bus licence.  This licence will allow, for example, its holder to drive 12- and 15-passenger vans that Transport Canada defines as large passenger vans.

Gallery

See also

Cutaway van chassis
Volkswagen Transporter

References

Buses by type